Peerless Volleyball Club is a men's volleyball team, based in Lima, Peru. They won the Peruvian Volleyball League in the 2010–11 and the 2011–12 season.

Results
 South American Championship:
 4th Place: 2010
 LNSV:
 Winners (2): 2010–11, 2011–12

References

Sport in Lima